Gabriele Kaiser is a German mathematics educator. She is a professor of mathematics education at the University of Hamburg.

Kaiser completed a doctorate in 1986 and a habilitation in 1997 at the University of Kassel. Her doctoral dissertation, Anwendungen im Mathematikunterricht - Konzeptionen und Untersuchungen zur unterrichtlichen Realisierung, was supervised by Werner Blum. She became a professor at Hamburg in 1998, and served as vice dean of education from 2010 to 2016. Since 2005 she has been editor-in-chief of the journal ZDM Mathematics Education, and she is the editor or co-editor of 28 books on mathematics education.

Kaiser was a speaker at the 2002 International Congress of Mathematicians.
In 2012, a festschrift was published in her honor.

References

External links
Home page

Year of birth missing (living people)
Living people
University of Kassel alumni
Academic staff of the University of Hamburg
20th-century German mathematicians
German women mathematicians
Mathematics educators
21st-century German mathematicians
20th-century German women
21st-century German women